The Moraga Adobe is located at 24 Adobe Lane in Orinda, California. It was built by Don Joaquin Moraga who was the grandson of Jose Joaquin Moraga an early Spanish explorer in California who founded the city of San Jose, California. In 1835, Mexico granted , El Rancho Laguna de los Palos Colorados, to Joaquin Moraga and his cousin Juan Bernal. Six years later in 1841, Joaquin built this house, which is the oldest of the five surviving adobe houses in Contra Costa County. The adobe sits on a knoll at the center of the  property of what is left of the original land grant. The house has been restored and remodeled twice since it was photographed for HABS, first in 1941 when Katharine Brown White Irvine of Oakland, California purchased the old adobe, making additions such as adding three bedrooms and a veranda, and covering the adobe walls and again in 1964 when it was incorporated into a private home. The house is not accessible to the public and it is fenced off. However, it was photographed in 1922 for the Historical American Building Survey (HABS). Today, the Moraga Adobe is privately owned and unoccupied.  The overall condition of the original adobe section and the more modern addition is neglected, but the building appears sound. The surrounding property was recently purchased, and the new owners have boarded up the windows to prevent vandalism and trespassing. The Moraga Adobe has been designated as a Historical Landmark by the City of Orinda and the State of California. A campaign has been started to purchase the property and restore the house to its 1848 configuration, to be used as a museum and educational site.

See also
National Register of Historic Places listings in Contra Costa County, California

References

External links 
Friends of the Moraga Adobe

History of Contra Costa County, California
Houses in Contra Costa County, California
National Register of Historic Places in Contra Costa County, California
Houses on the National Register of Historic Places in California
Historic American Buildings Survey in California
Historic districts on the National Register of Historic Places in California
1841 establishments in Alta California
Houses completed in 1841
Orinda, California
Adobe buildings and structures in California